Statistics of Swiss Super League in the 1940–41 season.

Overview
It was contested by 12 teams, and FC Lugano won the championship.

League standings

Results

Sources 
 Switzerland 1940-41 at RSSSF

Swiss Football League seasons
Swiss
1940–41 in Swiss football